Dah Sing Banking Group Limited (DSBG) is a Hong Kong-based banking and financial company, headquartered in Wan Chai. It has been listed on the Hong Kong Stock Exchange since 2004. It has three main banking subsidiaries (Dah Sing Bank, Banco Comercial de Macau and Dah Sing Bank (China) Limited) providing relevant services through a branch network of around 70 branches over Hong Kong, Macau and Mainland China, and a securities trading company. 

The group was established on 1 May 1947. Mr. David Shou-Yeh Wong was appointed as the chairman whilst Mr. Harold Tsu-Hing Wong (王祖興), the son of Mr. David Wong, joined as the group managing director and chief executive of DSBG.

History 

1947: Establishment of Dah Sing Bank, Limited (DSB).

1987: DSB acquired Hong Kong Industrial and Commercial Bank Limited; Public listing of Dah Sing Financial Holdings Limited(DSFH)

1990: Establishment of Dah Sing Life Assurance Co. Limited.

1993: DSFH acquired Wing On Bank Limited.

1994: Dah Sing Bank transferred its 40% ownership at Hong Kong Industrial and Commercial Bank to China Construction Bank.

1997: DSFH, Abbey National plc and Hambros Bank Limited went into a contract to jointly run the Wing On Bank Limited as a Hong Kong-based private bank and renamed it as DAHP.

1998: Dah Sing Bank sold an additional 30% shareholding interest at Jian Sing Bank (formerly known as Hong Kong Industrial and Commercial Bank) to China Construction Bank.

2000: DSFH acquired ownerships of DAHP from Abbey and SG Hambros (formerly known as Hambros Bank Limited). DAHP became a subsidiary of DSFH while the private banking business, loans and deposits from DAHP were undertaken by Dah Sing Bank.

2002: China Construction Bank purchased the remaining equity interest of Jian Sing Bank from Dah Sing Bank.

2004: Separate listing of Dah Sing Banking Group Limited.

2005: DSBG completed the acquisition of 100% of Pacific Finance (HK) Limited, 100% of BCM Bank (Banco Comercial de Macau) and 96% equity interests in BCM’s general and life insurance subsidiaries from Banco Comercial Portugues.

2007: DSB completed the acquisition of a 17% total equity interest in the Bank of Chongqing (BOCQ).

2010: DSB integrated with MEVAS Bank (formerly known as DAHP).

2011: Establishment of OK Finance Limited.

2017: DSFH sold its entire shareholding interest in life insurance business in Hong Kong and Macau to Tahoe Investment Group Co. Limited.

2019: First bank in Hong Kong to offer full virtual loan application – no need for income proof and address proof

2021: Opened Queen's Road East Branch

Structure 
Dah Sing Financial Group is the ultimate parent company, which owns a majority share of Dah Sing Financial Holdings, which in turn owns a majority share of Dah Sing Banking Group and other non-banking financial assets. 

Dah Sing Banking Group has three banking entities under it: Dah Sing Bank, Banco Comercial de Macau and Dah Sing Bank (China) Limited.

Senior leadership

Dah Sing Financial Holdings 
Dah Sing Financial Holdings was founded on 22 Apr 1987. 

 Chairman: David Wong Shou-yeh (since 1987)
 Chief Executive: Derek Wong Hon-hing (since 2002)

List of Former Chief Executive's 
 Ronald Carstairs (1991–2001)

Dah Sing Banking Group 
Dah Sing Banking Group was founded on 11 Mar 2004. 

 Chairman: David Wong Shou-yeh (since 2004)
 Chief Executive: Derek Wong Hon-hing (since 2017); second term

List of Former Chief Executive's 
 Derek Wong Hon-hing (2004–2011)
 Harold Wong Tsu-hing (2011–2017)

Dah Sing Bank 
Dah Sing Bank was founded on 1 May 1947. 

 Chairman: David Wong Shou-yeh (since 1983)
 Chief Executive: Harold Wong Tsu-hing (since 2011)

List of Former Chairmen 
 Yang Yuan-loong (1947–1957)
 Wong Shih-sing (1957–1983)

List of Former Chief Executive's 
 Edward Cheung Ting-yat (1974–1986)
John William Simpson (1986–1991)
Ronald Carstairs (1991–2000)
Derek Wong Hon-hing (2000–2011)

See also 
 List of banks in Hong Kong

References

External links 

 

Companies listed on the Hong Kong Stock Exchange
Banks established in 1947
Banks of Hong Kong
1947 establishments in Hong Kong
Hong Kong brands